Filiptschenkia is a genus of flies in the family Stratiomyidae.

Species
Filiptschenkia sargoides Pleske, 1926

References

Stratiomyidae
Brachycera genera
Diptera of Asia
Monotypic Brachycera genera